The Incomplete Triangle is the debut album by Lansing-Dreiden.  It was released on April 6, 2004.  It is a mix of various genres, divided into three parts of 4 songs each (hence the name of the LP).  The first section of the album is the most rock-based, touching on garage rock and proto-punk among other styles.  The middle section slows down the music a little with dream pop, ambient, post-punk and Britpop.  The third and final section brings the energy back with late 80s/early 90s style synthpop.

Track listing

External links
 Review for The Incomplete Triangle

2004 debut albums
Lansing-Dreiden albums